Mamak railway station is a railway station in Ankara, Turkey, on the Başkentray commuter rail line.

References

Railway stations in Ankara Province